World village may refer to:
World village, an alternate name for the term "global village"
World Village, full name  Harmonia Mundi - World Village, a world music international record label
World Village Festival, annual music festival in Helsinki, Finland
Give Kids The World Village, nonprofit resort in Kissimmee, Florida for children with life-threatening illnesses and their families

See also
Global village (disambiguation)